WIKY-FM (104.1 MHz) is a full-service/adult contemporary music radio station serving the Evansville, Indiana radio market.

History
The call letters WIKY debuted in 1948,  when John A. Engelbrecht gained the FCC license for 820 AM.  WIKY signed on August 4, 1948. The studios were on the west side of Evansville, in a unique building with the studios in the basement and the Engelbrecht residence upstairs.  In 1953, Engelbrecht obtained one of the first FM licenses available, at 104.1 MHz.  The 820 AM frequency was sold to University of Southern Indiana and continues operation as WSWI. Over the past 60 years, the Engelbrecht family maintained ownership of WIKY through their company South Central Communications, which owns 5 stations in Evansville, as well as radio stations in Nashville and Knoxville and a Muzak provider (South Central Sound).

In the most recent Arbitron ratings report, WIKY is the most-listened-to radio station in the Evansville metro survey area. WIKY has been named "Best Radio Station" by the Evansville Courier Press "Reader's Choice" Awards the past two years, and was named "AC Station of the Year" (2008 - Markets 101+) by Radio and Records magazine.

It was announced on May 28, 2014, that Midwest Communications would purchase 9 of the 10 Stations owned by South Central Communications. (This includes the Evansville Cluster which include WIKY-FM along with sister stations WABX, WLFW & WSTO.) With this purchase, Midwest Communications expanded its portfolio of stations to Evansville, Knoxville and Nashville. The sale was finalized on September 2, 2014, at a price of $72 million.

References

External links

IKY-FM
Midwest Communications radio stations